Malcolm Adrian Emile Jaer (born 29 June 1995) is a South African rugby union player for the  in the Pro14 and the  in the Currie Cup. His regular position is fullback or fly-half.

Career

2011–2013 : Youth and South African Schools

Jaer played secondary school rugby for Hoërskool Brandwag in Uitenhage. He was selected in the Eastern Province Under-16 squad that played at the Grant Khomo Week tournament in 2011, in their Under-18 squad that played at the Academy Week in 2012 and their Under-18 squad that played at the Craven Week tournament in 2013. He scored a try for the Eastern Province in the latter competition, in their 21–32 defeat to the Free State.

Jaer's performances at the 2013 Craven Week led to his inclusion in the South African Schools side and he made one appearance for them in a 17–13 victory against France in George in August 2013.

2014–2015 : Eastern Province Kings and South Africa Under-20

After finishing school, Jaer joined the Eastern Province Academy and was included in the  senior squad during the 2014 Vodacom Cup competition. He made his debut on 25 April 2014, aged just , starting their match against the previously-unbeaten  in Durban, in which he helped them to a 27–11 victory.

In the second half of 2014, Jaer started all twelve of the  team's matches in the Under-19 Provincial Championship, his side's first season in Group A of the competition after they won promotion from Group B at the end of 2013. In his second match for the team, Jaer scored his first try in a 13–16 home defeat to the s. He scored two tries in their 32–26 victory over the s in Potchefstroom and a further two in the return match in Port Elizabeth. That meant he ended the competition as his side's leading try scorer, with eight tries overall. In addition, he took over the kicking duties from Jason Vers after three matches and contributed 64 points with the boot (through fourteen penalties and eleven conversions), to finish on 104 points, the highest by an Eastern Province player and fourth overall in Group A of the competition. He was promoted to the  side for their final two matches of the 2014 Under-21 Provincial Championship; with the Under-21 team already having finished top of Group B by winning all seven of their matches during the regular season, Jaer joined them for the semi-final match against . Jaer scored a try in their subsequent promotion play-off match against Eastern Cape rivals , helping them to a 64–9 victory and a place in Group A of the competition in 2015.

In March 2015, Jaer was named in an extended South Africa Under-20 training group as part of their preparation for the 2015 World Rugby Under 20 Championship. While he didn't feature in a friendly match against a Varsity Cup Dream Team in April 2015, he was included in the squad that toured Argentina in May 2015. He started their first match, scoring a try in a 25–22 win, but didn't feature in the second match. Upon the team's return, he was named in the final squad for the 2015 World Rugby Under 20 Championship. He played off the bench in the first of their three matches in Pool B of the competition, a 33–5 win against hosts Italy, but was not named in the matchday squad for their 40–8 win against Samoa or their 46–13 win over Australia, which saw South Africa finish top of Pool B to qualify for the semi-finals with the best record pool stage of all the teams in the competition. Jaer was used as a replacement in their semi-final match against England and scored South Africa's first try of the match in the 77th minute, but could not prevent them losing 20–28 to be eliminated from the competition by England for the second year in succession. He started his first match of the competition in their third-place play-off match against France, helping South Africa to a 31–18 win to secure third place in the competition.

Jaer returned to domestic rugby to play for the  side in their first season in Group A of the Under-21 Provincial Championship following promotion from Group B in 2014. The team struggled throughout the competition, winning just one of their twelve matches to finish bottom of the log.

2016–present : Southern Kings

In December 2015, Jaer was one of the first twenty players that signed contracts to play for the Southern Kings in the 2016 Super Rugby season.

References

South African rugby union players
Living people
1995 births
People from Uitenhage
Rugby union fly-halves
Rugby union fullbacks
Eastern Province Elephants players
Southern Kings players
South Africa Under-20 international rugby union players
Free State Cheetahs players
Cheetahs (rugby union) players
Rugby union players from the Eastern Cape
Griquas (rugby union) players